Titus Manlius Imperiosus Torquatus was a famous politician and general of the Roman Republic.  He had an outstanding career, being consul three times in 347, 344, and 340 BC, and dictator three times 353, 349, and 320 BC.  He was one of the early heroes of the Republic, alongside Cincinnatus, Cornelius Cossus, Furius Camillus, or Valerius Corvus.  As a young military tribune, he defeated a giant Gaul in single combat in one of the most famous duels of the Republic, which earned him the cognomen Torquatus after the torc he took from the Gaul's body.  He was also known for his moral virtues, especially his severity as he had his own son executed after he had disobeyed his orders in a battle.  His life was seen as a model for his descendants, who tried to emulate his heroic deeds, even centuries after his death.

Career 
His father Lucius was appointed dictator in 363 BC in order to fulfil religious duties, but instead undertook preparations for war. This resulted in strong opposition from the plebeian tribunes and he was brought to trial at the beginning of the next year, after he had resigned the dictatorship. Amongst the charges against him was that he had banished Titus from Rome on account of his speaking difficulties and made him work as a labourer. Upon hearing of these accusations against his father, Titus went to the home of the tribune Marcus Pomponius, where he was expected by the latter to provide further charges and was thus promptly admitted. However, once they were alone, he drew his hidden knife and threatened to stab the tribune unless he made a public oath not to hold an assembly to accuse Lucius Manlius, which Pomponius agreed to and duly performed. Titus Manlius' reputation grew on account of his filially pious actions, which helped him to be elected as a military tribune later in the year.

In 361 BC, Titus Manlius fought in the army of Titus Quinctius Poenus Capitolinus Crispinus against the Gauls during the Battle of the Anio River. When a Gaul of enormous size and strength challenged the Romans to single combat, Manlius accepted the challenge with the approval of Poenus after the rest of the army had held back from responding for a long period of time. Despite being physically inferior, he killed the Gaul with blows to the belly and groin, after which he stripped the corpse of a torc and placed it around his own neck. From this, he gained the agnomen Torquatus, a title that was passed down also to his descendants.

In 353 BC, he was named dictator and prepared to attack Caere, but they responded by sending envoys and were granted peace. The campaign was then directed towards the Falisci, but the Roman army found on arrival that the Falisci had disappeared. They ravaged the land but spared the cities before returning to Rome. He was appointed dictator again in 348 BC to oversee elections. A year later, he was elected to his first consulship. His second consulship came in 345 BC.

In 340 BC, when Manlius was consul for the third time, Rome had leadership over the Latin League. It received a delegation from member states headed by Lucius Annius, demanding coequal status in Roman government, such as a place in the senate and a consulship, but Manlius, appealing to Jupiter, refused them. Roundly abusing the Roman Jupiter, Annius fell down the steps of the public assembly, senseless. Manlius said he would strike down Rome's enemies as Jupiter struck down Annius. The Latin embassy required a safe conduct and an escort of magistrates to leave Rome unmolested. Rome realigned itself with the Samnites against the Latins.

During the conduct of the war, Manlius and his co-consul, Publius Decius Mus, decided that the old military discipline would be reinstated, and no man was allowed to leave his post, under penalty of death. Manlius's son, seeing an opportunity for glory, forgot this stricture, left his post with his friends, and defeated several Latin skirmishers in battle. Having the spoils brought to him, the father cried out in a loud voice and called the legion to assemble. Berating his son, he then handed him over for execution to the horror of all his men. Thus, "Manlian discipline."

After Decius Mus sacrificed himself to achieve victory at the battle of Vesuvius, Manlius was able to crush the Latin allies and pursue them into Campania. He defeated them again at Trifanum, bringing the war to an end, and returned to Rome. He was unable on account of ill health to conduct a further campaign against the Antiates and appointed Lucius Papirius Crassus as dictator to fulfil this role instead.

Legacy

In painting 

Sacrifice to the state was one of the favourite themes of French Neoclassical painters at the end of the 18th century and especially during the French Revolution.  The story of Torquatus' execution of his son was logically used by several of them.

Stemma of the Manlii Torquati 
Stemma taken from Münzer until "A. Manlius Torquatus, d. 208", and then Mitchell, with corrections.  All dates are BC.

See also
 Manlia gens

References

Bibliography

Ancient works 

 Titus Livius (Livy), History of Rome.
 Valerius Maximus, Factorum ac Dictorum Memorabilium (Memorable Deeds and Sayings).

Modern works 

T. Robert S. Broughton, The Magistrates of the Roman Republic, American Philological Association, 1952–1986.
Michael Crawford, Roman Republican Coinage, Cambridge University Press, 1974–2001.
 Jane F. Mitchell, "The Torquati", in Historia: Zeitschrift für Alte Geschichte, vol. 15, part 1, (January 1966), pp. 23–31.
Friedrich Münzer, Roman Aristocratic Parties and Families, translated by Thérèse Ridley, Johns Hopkins University Press, 1999 (originally published in 1920).
August Pauly, Georg Wissowa, et alii, Realencyclopädie der Classischen Altertumswissenschaft (abbreviated PW), J. B. Metzler, Stuttgart (1894–1980).
Robert Rosenblum, Transformations in Late Eighteenth Century Art, Princeton University Press, 1967.
Lily Ross Taylor and T. Robert S. Broughton, "The Order of the Two Consuls' Names in the Yearly Lists", Memoirs of the American Academy in Rome, 19 (1949), pp. 3–14.
F. W. Walbank, A. E. Astin, M. W. Frederiksen, R. M. Ogilvie (editors), The Cambridge Ancient History, vol. VII, part 2, The Rise of Rome to 220 B.C., Cambridge University Press, 1989.

4th-century BC deaths
4th-century BC Roman consuls
4th-century BC Roman generals
Ancient Roman dictators
Characters in Book VI of the Aeneid
Filicides
Titus, Imperiosus
Roman patricians
Year of birth unknown
Year of death unknown